Crosita elegans is a leaf beetle species in the genus Crosita with a Palaearctic distribution.

References

External links 

 Crosita elegans at insectoid.info

Chrysomelinae
Beetles described in 1968